Chevalet may refer to:
 Easel, French expression originally meaning "little horse", deriving from the diminutive for "cheval" (m) - "horse"
 Trestle support, an improvised table or device for lifting up work pieces
 Bridge (instrument), a device supporting the strings on a stringed musical instrument
 Wooden horse (device), a torture device
 Virginie Isabelle Chevalet, a synchronized swimmer 
 Émile Chevalet, a 19th-century French playwright and librettist